The XO sex-determination system (sometimes X0 sex-determination system) is a system that some species of insects, arachnids, and mammals use to determine the sex of offspring. In this system, there is only one sex chromosome, referred to as X. Males only have one X chromosome (XO), while females have two (XX). The letter O (sometimes a zero) signifies the lack of a second X.  Maternal gametes always contain an X chromosome, so the sex of the animals' offspring depends on whether a sex chromosome is present in the male gamete. Its sperm normally contains either one X chromosome or no sex chromosomes at all.

This system determines the sex of offspring among:
 Most arachnids with the exception of mites where a small majority are haplodiploid,
 Almost all apterygote and Paleopteran insects (e.g., dragonflies, silverfish)
 Most exopterygote insects (e.g., grasshoppers, crickets, cockroaches)
 Some nematodes, crustaceans, gastropod molluscs, and bony fish, notably in the genus Ancistrus
 Several mammals
 A few species of bat, including the hammer-headed bat, Buettikofer's epauletted fruit bat, Franquet's epauletted fruit bat, Peters's epauletted fruit bat, and Gambian epauletted fruit bat
 The Ryukyu spiny rat and Tokunoshima spiny rat

In a variant of this system, most individuals have two sex chromosomes (XX) and are hermaphroditic, producing both eggs and sperm with which they can fertilize themselves, while rare individuals are male and have only one sex chromosome (XO).  The model organism Caenorhabditis elegans—a nematode frequently used in biological research—is one such organism.

Some Drosophila species have XO males. These are thought to arise via the loss of the Y chromosome.

Evolution

XO sex determination can evolve from XY sex determination with about 2 million years.

Parthenogenesis
Parthenogenesis with XO sex-determination can occur by different mechanisms to produce either male or female offspring.

See also
 Sex-determination system
 Sexual differentiation
 Haplodiploid sex-determination system
 XY sex-determination system
 ZO sex-determination system
 ZW sex-determination system
 Temperature-dependent sex determination
 X chromosome
 Y chromosome

References

Sex-determination systems
Insect genetics
Arachnid anatomy